Vivere pericoloso  (or in another source, vivere pericolosamente ) is a phrase in the Italian language, which means "to live dangerously". Usually, the phrase is used for dangerous things, such as people living in dangerous areas because of disaster, and in fear of recurrence.

In Indonesia, this phrase was popularized by Indonesia's first president Sukarno in 1964 when his state address on the 19th anniversary of the nation's independence was entitled Tahun Vivere Pericoloso (The Year of Living Dangerously, abbreviated as Tavip), roughly a year before the coup attempt by the 30 September Movement.

The title of the address inspired Christopher Koch, an Australian author, to write a novel published in 1978 titled The Year of Living Dangerously, which was then made into a film with the same title. The 1982 film starring Mel Gibson, Sigourney Weaver and Linda Hunt tells the story of the events in Jakarta before and after the 30 September Movement launched its action.

The phrase was later used by the newspaper Sinar Harapan as a title of its critic corner.

External links
 Documentation video of Tahun Vivere Pericoloso on YouTube

Italian words and phrases
History of Indonesia